TeikyoSat-3  was a technology demonstrator and microbiology microsatellite intended to research the slime mold life cycle in space. Specifically, the effects of ionizing radiation (20-30 Gy/year) are or special concern. The primary mission is expected to be finished in 10–20 days with completion of first life cycle of slime mold in space, but mission can be extended to study evolutionary adaptations for a maximum of 1 year. Also, a novel thermal control system capable of keeping a stable (10 °C to 28 °C) temperature in small (20 kg) microsatellite bus is being tested. The satellite is made in Teikyo University (Japan) and has a size of 320x320x370mm. The microsatellite microbiology experimental platform is intended to address issues with cost and uncertain future of experiments based on International Space Station.
TeikyoSat-3 also transmit its telemetry uncoded at 473.45 MHz, and any amateur radio operator is welcome to share downlink data.

References

External links

 Eoportal.org Gunters space TeikyoSat-3 page
 Development team page (Japanese)

Spacecraft launched in 2014
Spacecraft which reentered in 2014
2014 in Japan
Satellites of Japan